"You Gotta Move" is a traditional African-American spiritual song. Since the 1940s, the song has been recorded by a variety of gospel musicians, usually as "You Got to Move" or "You've Got to Move". It was later popularized with blues and blues rock secular adaptations by Mississippi Fred McDowell and the Rolling Stones.

Early gospel songs
The Two Gospel Keys recorded "You've Got to Move", which was released on a 78-rpm record in 1948. Emma Daniels (vocals and guitar) and Mother Sally Jones (vocals and tambourine) comprised the gospel music duo. Similar renditions followed by Elder Charles D. Beck (1949), Sister Rosetta Tharpe (1950), the Original Five Blind Boys of Alabama (1953), and the Hightower Brothers (1956).

Reverend Gary Davis recorded the song in 1962; his lyrics include:

Later renditions
In 1964, soul singer Sam Cooke recast the song with lyrics about a broken relationship for his 1963 album Night Beat.  Cash Box described it as having "top shuffle-rhythm blues sounds."  In 1965, Mississippi bluesman Fred McDowell recorded it as a slow, slide guitar hill country blues solo piece. The song generally follows a seven-bar or an eight-bar blues arrangement and has been compared to "Sitting on Top of the World". McDowell uses lyrics closer to Davis' 1962 rendition, but adds a haunting slide guitar line that doubles the vocal. A verse from the song is inscribed on his headstone:

The Rolling Stones version

McDowell's rendition inspired many subsequent recordings, including a version by the Rolling Stones. The Stones regularly performed "You Gotta Move" during their 1969 US tour. They recorded a version at the Muscle Shoals Sound Studios in Alabama in December 1969, with later recording in England in 1970. It was later included on their 1971 album Sticky Fingers without a songwriter's credit. Later reissues listed the authors as McDowell and Gary Davis.

Mick Jagger sings the song in a Southern black dialect, with Mick Taylor's electric slide-guitar accompaniment. In an interview originally published in Guitar Player, Taylor said he used a Fender Telecaster for the slide part and a 12-string guitar. He explained that Keith Richards played a National guitar, though Taylor could not remember which one Richards usedthe all-steel one or the "really great, beautiful guitar... made of wood and metal."

Two different concert versions are included as bonus tracks on the group's Get Yer Ya-Ya's Out! (1970) album and another on Love You Live (1977). The latter features Billy Preston, who had played when he was 16 years old on Sam Cooke's 1963 version.

See also
African-American Vernacular English

Notes

References 

1940s songs
Blues songs
The Rolling Stones songs
Aerosmith songs
Song recordings produced by Jimmy Miller
Year of song unknown
Songwriter unknown